Osieki Lęborskie  (or Òseczi; formerly ) is a village in the administrative district of Gmina Choczewo, within Wejherowo County, Pomeranian Voivodeship, in northern Poland.

The village has a railway station on the disused Wejherowo to Garczegorze line (PKP rail line 230), although this lies more than a kilometre outside the village proper on the road between Osieki Lęborskie and Lublewo.

For details of the history of the region, see History of Pomerania.

Osieki Lęborskie has a population of 275, though this increases in the summer due to the presence of a number of holiday homes in the village.

References

Images of Osieki Lęborskie

Villages in Wejherowo County